Katie Brayben (born 3 September) is an English actress and musician who has performed in stage plays, television and musicals and also as a singer and songwriter with her own music. She is presently best known for her portrayal of the title role of Carole King in the London production of Beautiful: The Carole King Musical, for which she won the 2015 Laurence Olivier Award for Best Actress in a Musical.

Biography
Brayben is an English actress, singer and musician who also performs as an original songwriter playing piano and guitar. Born Katie Burke, her parents being London blues-based performers Mick (Mike) Burke and Frances (Fran) McGillivray, she was raised in a musical household in the London borough of Lewisham; her sister Jo Burke is also a folk music performer (singer and violinist). She studied at the Rose Bruford College of Theatre and Performance, from which she graduated with a Bachelor of Arts in 2003. She made her West End debut when she took over the lead role of Sophie in the 10th anniversary production of Mamma Mia! and later starred opposite Matt Smith in the American Psycho musical. In 2014 she joined the production of Mike Bartlett's King Charles III playing Princess Diana, and moved with the show when it transferred from the Almeida Theatre to the West End. In 2015 when that show moved to Broadway, she took on the title role of Carole King in the London production of Beautiful: The Carole King Musical. Her performance won the Laurence Olivier Award for Best Actress in a Musical.

Filmography

Stage

References

External links

English musical theatre actresses
Year of birth missing (living people)
Living people
People from the London Borough of Lewisham
Actresses from London
Place of birth missing (living people)